Team Spirit is a 2016 French drama film directed by Christophe Barratier.

Plot
Based on the true life story of Jérôme Kerviel, a French trader who was convicted in the 2008 Société Générale trading loss for breach of trust, forgery and unauthorized use of the bank's computers, resulting in losses valued at €4.9 billion.

Kerviel was born in 1977 in a small fishing town in Brittany. He and his brother were brought up simply by their hardworking parents who were devoted to each other. He earned a master's degree in Finance.

In 2000, the Société Générale recruits him in the middle office. This "Secretariat" has the task of accounting for orders placed by traders to the legendary trading floor. The young Jerome Kerviel will learn fast, very fast ...

Cast

 Arthur Dupont as Jérôme Kerviel
 François-Xavier Demaison as Fabien Keller
 Sabrina Ouazani as Sofia
 Thomas Coumans as Mathieu Priester
 Tewfik Jallab as Samir
 Ambroise Michel as Tiago
 Mhamed Arezki as Nouredine
 Steve Driesen as Jean-Pierre Kaplan
 Sören Prévost as Benoit Froger
 Franz-Rudolf Lang as Sébastien Mangelle
 Sophie-Charlotte Husson as Valérie Casanova
 Stéphane Bak as Jules
 Luc Schiltz as Colin Blake
 Mas Belsito as Lulu
 Roby Schinasi as Frédéric Bourboulon
 Benjamin Ramon as Ben
 Luc Gentil as Daniel Bouton
 Claudine Pelletier as Jeanne Kerviel
 Michel Masiero as Louis Kerviel

References

External links
 

2016 films
2016 biographical drama films
French biographical drama films
Films about fraud
Films set in the 2000s
Drama films based on actual events
2010s French-language films
Films set in Paris
Films directed by Christophe Barratier
Films produced by Jacques Perrin
Biographical films about fraudsters
Films about con artists
Cultural depictions of French men
Cultural depictions of fraudsters
2016 drama films
2010s French films